Saint-Caprais-de-Lerm (Languedocien: Sent Grapasi de l'Èrm) is a commune in the Lot-et-Garonne department in south-western France.

See also
Communes of the Lot-et-Garonne department

References

Saintcapraisdelerm